Gustaf Heden (born 10 May 1985) is a Swedish musician, writer and actor. He is most known for the album Spectorbullets, the play Just a Few Hundred More and the screenplay Flaket.

Music
In 2005 Heden founded the London band The Michelles with Tim Lalonde. After recognition from BBC and XFM radio DJ Rob Da Bank, the band was picked up by German record label Kitty-Yo. Heden's song "Springtime" was released as a 7" single in 2006, and was also used in the Julie Delpy film Two Days in Paris.

In 2009 Heden started recording new songs with producer and Russell Burn in Edinburgh. The collaboration evolved into the band Spectorbullets, and in 2010 they released their eponymous debut album on Innes Reekie and Burn's new label Mayakovsky Produkts. For most part the work of a duo, with Burn on drums and Heden on remaining instruments and vocals, the album also featured poet and writer Paul Reekie (1962–2010) performing the vocal on opener "He Needs It", lyrics for the track "Drop" by Joanna Pickering, as well as contributions from Malcolm Ross and Davy Henderson. The album received 4 stars out of 5 from The Scotsman, The List and Uncut Magazine.  The Scotsman described Spectorbullets as "the missing link between Syd Barret and The Libertines".

Theater
In 2013, Heden's play "Just A Few Hundred More" was selected into Thespis Theater Festival, New York.   Heden staged the play for a four night run at the Cabrini Repertory Theater, and recorded a soundtrack of new music for the play with members of The Zen Archers and Brent Kirkpatrick, under the name The Amphetamines, a fictitious band which appeared in the script.

In 2014 Heden staged the play again, this time at Brooklyn dive Rbar. To promote the play, a video to one of The Amphetamines' songs from the soundtrack, "Jungle Cactus"  was made by Fabian Svensson and Isac Stridsman, featuring Heden, Kirkpatrick and Eric Meier in an East Village Jungle.

After moving to Sweden, Heden continued writing plays, started theater and music group The Athletes and staged a reading of "In the Sand" at Häng Bar, Malmö, with among others Marika Lagercrantz in the cast and followed by a live performance of the soundtrack.

Film
Heden wrote the screenplay to Fabian Svensson and Jens Klevje's Flaket, which premiered at Gothenburg Film Festival in 2016 and was co-produced with SVT. The film featured a cast of Swedish actors – Marika Lagercrantz, Reine Brynolfsson, Stina Ekblad, Lars-Erik Berenett and Iggy Malmborg. Heden have also made film scores for The American Dream vs Go Greyhound, Mexicali, Henry, Nug and WILLPOWER that are all directed by Max E. Barnes Herrlander.

References

External links

 
 Interview with Marika Lagercrantz on "Flaket", SVT 
 Spectorbullets in *Leither Magazine
Kitty-Yo The Michelles
Scotland on Sunday Review

Living people
Swedish male musicians
1985 births